Aldine was an adjective and meant "having the characteristics of Aldus", and in particular the most famous man by that name, the publisher Aldus Manutius, creator of the "Aldine" (Bembo) typeface (implemented on the IBM Selectric Composer). Aldine may also mean:
Aldine, Indiana, an unincorporated community in Starke County
Aldine, New Jersey, an unincorporated community in Salem County
Aldine, Houston, Texas, a former town in Harris County, Texas, United States
Aldine Independent School District, a school district in Houston, Texas, United States
Aldine Press, a 15th-century printing–publishing office started by Aldus Manutius
Aldine Edition of the British Poets
 The Aldine, a monthly American art journal published in New York from 1868 to 1879
Ruth Aldine